Isbell Field  is a city-owned public-use airport located two nautical miles (3.7 km) north of the central business district of Fort Payne, a city in DeKalb County, Alabama, United States. According to the FAA's National Plan of Integrated Airport Systems for 2009–2013, it is categorized as a general aviation facility.

Facilities and aircraft 
It has one runway designated 4/22 with an asphalt surface measuring 5,001 by 100 feet (1,524 x 30 m).

For the 12-month period ending May 12, 2009, the airport had 16,470 general aviation aircraft operations, an average of 45 per day. At that time there were 56 aircraft based at this airport: 82% single-engine, 13% multi-engine and 5% jet.

It was named for John Birdwell Isbell, U.S. Attorney for the Northern District of Alabama.

References

External links 
 Airfield photos for 4A9 from Civil Air Patrol
 Aerial image as of 18 February 1997  from USGS The National Map
 

Airports in Alabama
Transportation buildings and structures in DeKalb County, Alabama